Rosh Pinah is a mining town located in southern Namibia, close to the border with South Africa. West of the town lies Diamond Area 1, the main diamond mining area of Namibia. Rosh Pinah belongs to the Oranjemund electoral constituency. The town is connected via road to Aus and Oranjemund.

Copper was discovered here in the 1920s, and in 1963 German-born Jew Mose Kohan discovered zinc in the nearby Hunz Mountains in 1963. He also coined the name "Rosh Pinah" which is a Hebrew term for "cornerstone". More significant deposits of zinc were found in 1968.

Rosh Pinah is home to two mines, Skorpion Zinc and Rosh Pinah mine. Both mines extract mainly zinc and lead. Like other mining towns in Namibia, the settlement was created when the first mine was opened. The Rosh Pinah mine was established in 1969 and has been in continuous operation since then. Skorpion Zinc opened in 2001 and is the eighth-largest zinc mine in the world. It is the largest employer in town, providing 1,900 jobs.

The settlement is administered by the company RoshSkor (named after and co-owned by both mining operators) because it does not have its own local government authority and falls, like all Namibian settlements, under its regional administration. The town manager is Slabbert Burger. The town is economically entirely dependent on its mines which own 90% of the property and provide the vast majority of jobs. "If the mines close, Rosh Pinah will become another Kolmanskop, as we are not sustainable as a town", Burger stated in 2019. Hoeksteen Combined School and Tsau ǁKhaeb Secondary School are government schools located in town.

External links

References

Mining communities in Africa
Populated places in the ǁKaras Region
Populated places established in 1969
1969 establishments in South West Africa
Mining in Namibia